MA 30 may refer to:
FUL MA 30 Graffiti, a German ultralight trike design
Massachusetts Route 30, an American road.